Leptomyrmex burwelli is a species of ant in the genus Leptomyrmex.

References

Dolichoderinae
Hymenoptera of Australia
Insects described in 2009